Luggi Waldleitner (1913–1998) was a German film producer. In 1951 he set up Roxy Film which became one of the country's leading film production companies.

Selected filmography

 Thank You, I'm Fine (1948)
 A Thousand Red Roses Bloom (1952)
 That Can Happen to Anyone (1952)
 Until We Meet Again (1952)
 Everything for Father (1953)
 A Musical War of Love (1953)
 Oasis (1955)
 The Barrings (1955)
 The Daring Swimmer (1957)
 Rosemary (1958)
 Conny and Peter Make Music (1960)
 The Last of Mrs. Cheyney (1961)
 Street of Temptation (1962)
 Eleven Years and One Day (1963)
 Seven Days Grace (1969)
 The Sex Nest (1970)
 Love Is Only a Word (1971)
 Tears of Blood (1972)
 The Stuff That Dreams Are Made Of (1972)
 All People Will Be Brothers (1973)
 Three Men in the Snow (1974)
 Only the Wind Knows the Answer (1974)
 The Net (1975)
 To the Bitter End (1975)
 The Sternstein Manor (1976)
 The Glass Cell (1978)
 The Man in the Rushes (1978)
 The Marriage of Maria Braun (1979)
 Lili Marleen (1981)
 Silence Like Glass (1989)
 Fiorile (1993)
 Beyond Silence (1996)

References

Bibliography
 Bock, Hans-Michael & Bergfelder, Tim. The Concise CineGraph. Encyclopedia of German Cinema. Berghahn Books, 2009.

External links

1913 births
1998 deaths
German film producers
People from Ebersberg (district)
Commanders Crosses of the Order of Merit of the Federal Republic of Germany
Film people from Bavaria